Downe is a village in London.

Downe may also refer to:

People
 Bill Downe (born 1952), Canadian banker
 Don Downe (born 1951), Canadian politician and farmer
 Edward Downe Jr. (born 1929), American businessman and socialite
 Percy Downe (born 1954), Canadian politician
 Ryan Downe, American musician and audio engineer
 Taime Downe (born 1964), American musician

Other uses
 Downe (crater), a feature on Mars
 Downe Bank, a nature reserve in Bromley, London
 Downe Communications, a publishing company
 Downe Hospital, in Downpatrick, Northern Ireland
 Downe House, Richmond Hill, a listed building in London
 Downe House School, a girls' boarding school in Berkshire, England
 Downe Township, New Jersey, a township in Cumberland County, New Jersey
 Bob Downe, a character of Australian comedian Mark Trevorrow
 Earl of Downe, a title in the Peerage of Ireland
 Viscount Downe, a title in the Peerage of Ireland

See also
 Down (disambiguation)
 Downer (disambiguation)
 Downey (disambiguation)